Brian Lawrence Gabbitas (born c. 1935) is an English former professional rugby league footballer who played in the 1950s and 1960s.

Playing career

Hunslet
Gabbitas made his début for Hunslet on Boxing Day 1952. He went on to make 343 appearances for the club before announcing his retirement in December 1965.

Gabbitas played  in Hunslet's 12-2 victory over Hull Kingston Rovers in the 1962 Yorkshire County Cup Final during the 1962–63 season at Headingley Rugby Stadium, Leeds on Saturday 27 October 1962.

Gabbitas played  in Hunslet's 16-20 defeat by Wigan in the 1965 Challenge Cup Final during the 1964–65 season at Wembley Stadium, London on Saturday 8 May 1965, in front of a crowd of 89,016.

Wigan's Ray Ashby, and Hunslet's Brian Gabbitas, jointly won the Lance Todd Trophy for man of the match in the 1965 Challenge Cup final, it was the first time two players polled the same number of votes.

International honours
Gabbitas won a cap for Great Britain while at Hunslet in 1959 against France.

Gabbitas played  for English League XIII while at Hunslet in the 8-26 defeat by France on Saturday 22 November 1958 at Knowsley Road, St. Helens.

References

External links
!Great Britain Statistics at englandrl.co.uk (statistics currently missing due to not having appeared for both Great Britain, and England)

1930s births
Living people
English rugby league players
Great Britain national rugby league team players
Hunslet F.C. (1883) players
Lance Todd Trophy winners
Rugby league five-eighths
Rugby league players from Leeds